Benedetto Manzoli (died 26 August 1585) was a Roman Catholic prelate who served as Bishop of Reggio Emilia (1578–1585).

Biography
On 9 April 1578, Benedetto Manzoli was appointed during the papacy of Pope Gregory XIII as Bishop of Reggio Emilia.
He served as Bishop of Reggio Emilia until his death on 9 March 1578.

References

External links and additional sources
 (for Chronology of Bishops) 
 (for Chronology of Bishops) 

16th-century Italian Roman Catholic bishops
Bishops appointed by Pope Gregory XIII
1585 deaths